Diassara is a town in the Iolonioro Department of Bougouriba Province in south-western Burkina Faso. The town has a population of 2,083.

References

Populated places in the Sud-Ouest Region (Burkina Faso)
Bougouriba Province